Finland competed at the 1988 Winter Olympics in Calgary, Alberta, Canada.

Medalists

Competitors
The following is the list of number of competitors in the Games.

Alpine skiing

Women

Biathlon

Men

Men's 4 x 7.5 km relay

 1 A penalty loop of 150 metres had to be skied per missed target.
 2 One minute added per missed target.

Cross-country skiing

Men

 C = Classical style, F = Freestyle

Men's 4 × 10 km relay

Women

 C = Classical style, F = Freestyle

Women's 4 × 5 km relay

Ice hockey

Group A
Top three teams (shaded ones) entered the medal round.

Switzerland 2-1 Finland
Finland 10-1 France
Finland 3-1 Canada
Finland 3-3 Sweden
Finland 5-1 Poland

Medal round
The top three teams from each group play the top three teams from the other group once. Points from previous games against their own group carry over.

 Finland 8-0 West Germany
 Czechoslovakia 5-2 Finland
 Finland 2-1 Soviet Union

Leading scorers

Team roster

Nordic combined 

Men's individual

Events:
 normal hill ski jumping 
 15 km cross-country skiing 

Men's Team

Three participants per team.

Events:
 normal hill ski jumping 
 10 km cross-country skiing

Ski jumping 

Men's team large hill

 1 Four teams members performed two jumps each. The best three were counted.

Speed skating

Men

References 

 Official Olympic Reports
 International Olympic Committee results database
 Olympic Winter Games 1988, full results by sports-reference.com

Nations at the 1988 Winter Olympics
1988
W